Gambhiram is a suburb of the city of Visakhapatnam state of Andhra Pradesh, India. It is known for engineering colleges and as a residential area. The Indian Institute of Management Visakhapatnam campus is situated nearby.

Transport
It is 7km from Madhurawada and is well connected with Maddilapalem and Dwaraka Nagar.

APSRTC routes

References

Neighbourhoods in Visakhapatnam